The Bahamas competed at the 2019 Pan American Games in Lima, Peru from July 26 to August 11, 2019.

On July 3, 2019, the Bahamas Olympic Committee announced a team of 33 athletes (20 men and 13 women) competing in four sports: athletics, judo, swimming and tennis.

During the opening ceremony of the games, tennis player Justin Roberts carried the flag of the country as part of the parade of nations.

The Bahamas won one medal at the games, the lowest for the country since winning zero in 1975 in Mexico City.

Competitors
The following is the list of number of competitors (per gender) participating at the games per sport/discipline.

Medalists
The following competitors from The Bahamas won medals at the games. In the by discipline sections below, medalists' names are bolded.

Athletics (track and field)

The Bahamas qualified 19 track and field athletes (12 men and seven women). The team won one bronze medal, the only one for the country at the games.

Key
Note–Ranks given for track events are for the entire round
Q = Qualified for the next round
q = Qualified for the next round as a fastest loser or, in field events, by position without achieving the qualifying target
PB = Personal best
SB = Seasonal best
DNF = Did not finish
NM = No mark

Men
Track events

Michael Mathieu was named to the team and did not compete in any event

Field events

Combined events – Decathlon

Women
Track events

Field event

Judo

Bahamas qualified two female judoka. This mark the country's debut in the sport at the Pan American Games.

Women

Swimming

The Bahamas qualified ten swimmers (six men and four women). The team was named after the completion of the National Championships at the end of June.

Men

Women

Mixed

Swam in the heat only

Tennis

The Bahamas qualified two male tennis players.

Men

See also
Bahamas at the 2020 Summer Olympics

References

Nations at the 2019 Pan American Games
2019
2019 in Bahamian sport